The 1999 Georgia Bulldogs football team represented the University of Georgia during the 1999 NCAA Division I-A football season. The Bulldogs completed the season with an 8–4 record.  During the 1990s, the Bulldogs compiled a record of 72–43–1 under Coaches Donnan and Ray Goff for a .625 winning percentage.  Georgia's cumulative record through 1999 was 633–358–54, a .632 winning percentage.

Schedule

Rankings

Personnel
K Hap Hines, Sr.

References

Georgia
Georgia Bulldogs football seasons
ReliaQuest Bowl champion seasons
Georgia Bulldogs football